Neptis ilira  is an Indomalayan butterfly of the family Nymphalidae first described by Napoleon Manuel Kheil in 1884.

Subspecies
N. i. ilira Nias
N. i. palawanica Staudinger, 1889 Philippines (Palawan)
N. i. cindia Eliot, 1969 northeast India to Peninsular Malaya, Sumatra, Borneo, Pulau Tioman
N. i. ria Eliot, 1969Java

References 

ilira
Butterflies described in 1884